Eberhard Bopst (25 December 1913 – 12 October 1942) was a German U-boat commander in World War II.

Naval career
Eberhard Bopst joined the Reichsmarine in April 1933 and prior to transferring to the U-boat section served on the destroyers Georg Thiele (as 3rd Watch Officer, 1936–1937), Leberecht Maass (1937–1938) and Bernd von Arnim (December 1938 – 1940). On Bernd von Arnim he saw action in the Spanish Civil War, receiving the Spanish Cross in Silver without Swords, and at the Battles of Narvik, receiving the Narvik Shield. After the Norwegian Campaign he returned to Germany, joining the U-boat arm in July 1940. He went down with her when she was sunk with all hands in position , by depth charges from an RAF Liberator on 12 October 1942. Bopst was posthumously promoted to Korvettenkapitän.

Awards
Four Year Wehrmacht Long Service Award - March 1937
Spanish Cross in Silver without Swords - 6 June 1939
Iron Cross 2nd Class - November 1939
Destroyer War Badge - April 1940
Narvik Shield - April 1940
Iron Cross 1st Class - August 1941

References

Bibliography

1913 births
1942 deaths
U-boat commanders (Kriegsmarine)
German military personnel of the Spanish Civil War
Recipients of the Iron Cross (1939), 1st class
Reichsmarine personnel
Military personnel from Berlin
Kriegsmarine personnel killed in World War II
People lost at sea
Deaths by airstrike during World War II
People from Charlottenburg